Pseudoganisa gonioptera is a moth in the family Eupterotidae. It was described by West in 1932. It is found in the Philippines (Luzon, Mindoro, Palawan, Leyte, Samar). The Global Lepidoptera Names Index lists this name as a synonym of Pseudoganisa currani.

References

Moths described in 1932
Eupterotinae